Body Love may refer to:

Music
 Body Love (album), a 1977 album by Klaus Schulze
 Body Love Vol. 2, another 1977 album by Klaus Schulze
 "Body Love" (song), a 2017 song by IDER

Radio
 BodyLove, a health-oriented radio soap opera